Thomas William Kirkwood (1884–1971) was a Scottish champion polo player. He competed in the 1924 International Polo Cup.

References 

Scottish polo players
International Polo Cup
1884 births
Scottish cricketers
Europeans cricketers
1971 deaths